Rabbi Yosef Haim HaCohen (1851 Mogador, Morocco – September 25, 1921 Jerusalem, Mandatory Palestine)  was the President of the  Ma’araviim Community in Jerusalem, as well as the rabbi, dayan (rabbinical judge),  shadar (fund raiser and emissary) and rabad (Chief Rabbinical Judge) of the congregation.

Biography
Yosef Haim HaCohen was born in Mogador, Morocco in 1851 to Yehudah and Simha. In 1864, at the age of thirteen, HaCohen and his family immigrated to Ottoman Palestine. The family settled in the Old City of Jerusalem. He enrolled in the Maghrebi Jewish school for religious studies where his melamed (teacher) was Rabbi Mercado Presko, known colloquially as Hakham David. At the age of nineteen, HaCohen married Priha, a fellow Moroccan Jew, but the union was childless. In 1897 Rabbi HaCohen took a second wife named Frida, née Shrem, from Aleppo, Syria, with whom he had four children.

HaCohen was head of Yeshivat ‘Touvy Yisbau’ in Jerusalem.  He was a follower of the Mekubalim (Kabbalists) at ‘Beit–El’ yeshiva and synagogue and taught at Porat Yosef Yeshiva in Jerusalem.  Later Rabbi HaCohen was involved in founding and heading “Oz L’Torah” Yeshiva, as he announced in the newspaper.

On 21 May 1900, HaCohen was elected Chairman of the Ma’araviim Community in Jerusalem, in addition to being deputy to the Rishon LeZion Chief Rabbi of the Sephardic Jews in Palestine, Nahman Batito.  In 1915 after Rabbi Batito's death, HaCohen replaced him as Rabbi and President of the Moroccan Jewish community in Jerusalem.  In 1919, HaCohen got hundreds of people to sign a petition requesting the Delegates Committee of the Zionist Organization to support Misgav Ladach Hospital in the Old City of Jerusalem which suffered from sub-standard health conditions in the aftermath of World War I. 

Rabbi HaCohen worked as a religious emissary in a variety of countries. In 1894 he was sent to Jewish communities in Saudi Arabia, Uzbekistan, and the Caucasus Mountains. In 1899 Rabbi HaCohen was sent to Bukhara, where he raised funds for the Jerusalem congregation and also endeavored to establish academic institutes to deepen the level of Torah studies, by arranging for Torah Scrolls to be delivered to those remote communities. He cooperated with the local scholars and philanthropists to publish books.   A letter sent by the Chief Rabbi of Bukhara, at that time Rabbi Hizkiya HaCohen Rabin to his colleague Rabbi Elazarov states: “In the year 1899, the shadar arrived to Bukhara from the holy city of Jerusalem. Upon his arrival he informed the Bukharic Jewry of the sad news of Rabbi Nissim Baruch ZT”L, the rabad, Head Chief Judge from Jerusalem; and of Rabbi Eliyahu Mani ZT”L the chasid from Hebron” both passed away. During his lengthy stay in Bukhara he learned the native language of the Bukharian Jews. Rabbi HaCohen's final mission as a Shadar in 1903,  was to Algiers (this mission is mentioned in the book VaYa'an Shmuel pages 131-136), and to Constantine, Algeria. In the preface of the second volume of his book Minhat Cohen (1910) HaCohen  referred to his activity  there while writing a response which he signed as cited: “while I was residing during Mitzvah mission. Kasantina month Adar year 5663…”
Yosef Haim HaCohen died of a brief pulmonary infection on 22 Elul 5681 (25 September 1921).  A vast crowd attended his funeral at the Arialis lot, the Sephardic-Hasidic area on the Mount of Olives in Jerusalem. The eulogy was carried out by Rabbi Yosef Chaim Sonnenfeld, the Chief Rabbi of the Ashkenazi congregation in Jerusalem.

Publications
The Rabbi had many of his writings and Halachic judgements published both during his life and after. Many of these writings, such as “Kohi V’Reshit Oni”, on masachtot, “Darcheyi Haim”, sermons and novelties on the Torah, are now lost to history.

Minhat Cohen was the only book published during HaCohen's lifetime. The book begins with a Rabbinic endorsement by Rabbi HaCohen and contains various Halachic judgements and discussions on Talmudic law.

Before his death, Rabbi HaCohen gave a manuscript of his work Va’Yechalkhel Yosef to his son-in-law, Rabbi Amram Aburbeh who edited, proofread and published it in 1966 as a kuntris (booklet) within his own book Netivey-Am. Va’Yechalkhel Yosef contains the Rabbi's responsa, as well as additional answers by Rabbis Solomon Eliezer Alfandari and Yosef Chaim Sonnenfeld.

 In 2008, a new edition of Va’Yechalkhel Yosef was published by HaCohen's grandson Ehud Avivi.   

The Rabbi's views on Halachic matters were published in the HaMe’asef Toranic journal edited by Rabbi Ben Zion Avraham Cuenca, Head Judge in Jerusalem.

His students
Among his students were:
 Rabbi Amram Aburbeh (1894-1966), Talmud teacher in Porat Yosef Yeshiva and Sharey Zion Yeshiva in Jerusalem, Rabbi of the Nachlaot neighborhood in Jerusalem, founder of the Yeshiva and Or Zaruaa Synagogue, chief Rabbi of the Sephardic Community in Petah-Tikvah and a member of the Chief Rabbinate of Israel and author of Netivey Am 
 Rabbi Yosef Yitzchak Shloush (1888-1960), Rabad (Head Rabbinical Judge) of the Ma’araviim in Jerusalem and Rabbi Ezra Shrem of Porat Yosef Yeshiva

References 

 Montefiore censuses 1875 Jerusalem Municipal archive and web site Montefiore censuses. http://www.montefiorecensuses.org
  The link is found when entering the ID number as follows for Census year 1875, ID  1916, Scan Line 18   the result is City Jerusalem,   Kolel Sephardim, Name  Yosef Cohen,  Age  18, Status   Married,  Male,  Place of Birth  Morocco,  Notes Lives in the courtyard known to the Rabbi Yedidia Eiiakim

Sources
 
 
 HaCohen Yosef Haim. Minhat Cohen. 1st vol.  Jerusalem: Y.N. Levi & Co., 1902. 
 HaCohen Yosef Haim. Minhat Cohen. 2nd vol. Jerusalem:  Dfus Azriel, 1910.
 Kol Israel  Agudat Israel Youth newspaper, volume 1, second year (1921): (90-91) .
 
 Avivi, Tzameret-Rivka. “Minhat Cohen from Mogador to Jerusalem - Rabbi Yosef Haim HaCohen author of ‘Minhat Cohen’ and ‘V’Yechalchel Yosef’.” Brit the Moroccan Jews magazine, editor Asher Knafo, volume 28. 2009: 62–67.   
 
 
 Galis, Yakov. Encyclopedia for the History of Erez Israel Scholars. Jerusalem: HaRav Kook Institute, 1977 ed. Print.  Rabbi Yosef  Haim Hacohen tombstone text is cited by Galis pp. 82–83.
 
 
 
 Jerusalem Municipal Archive, Vaad Ha-Eda Ha-Sepharadit archive. Sephardic Committee archive in the Jerusalem Municipal archive the courtesy of Efraim Levi.
 
 Sir Moses Montefiore Censuses (MMC):  1866 Widows Census of the Ma’arvim community in Jerusalem and 1866 Census of Teachers and Student the Ma’arvim community. http://www.montefiorecensuses.org
The link is found when entering the ID number as follows for Census year 1866, ID  1447, Scan Line 24,
City   Jerusalem,   Kolel   North African,  the result is Yosef Cohen son of Simha and Yehudah Cohen.  Name Yosef Cohen, Age 10,  Status Orphan,  Male,  Father's Name Yehuda,  Mother's Name Simha .                           Name Simha Cohen,  Age 25,  Status Widow,  Female     Spouse's Name Yehuda,   Place of Birth Morocco,   Year of Arrival 1864,   Occupation Unemployed,   Economic Status Poor.
 The Religious Zionism archive -  HaRav Kook Institute, Jerusalem.
 The Old Court Museum, the Jewish quarter in Jerusalem. http://eng.shimur.org/Kaplan-Yishuv-Court/
 Rabbi Yosef Haim HaCohen family tree https://www.geni.com/people/Rabbi-Yosef-Haim-haCohen/6000000002529512703
 Rabbi Yosef Haim HaCohen, founder of Yeshiva Oz L'Torah petition to support published in HaAretz newspaper, (8 September 1921 ): (page 4) 
 Netivei Am website

1851 births
1921 deaths
19th-century rabbis in Jerusalem
Sephardi rabbis in Ottoman Palestine
Sephardic Haredi rabbis in Israel
20th-century rabbis in Jerusalem
19th-century Moroccan Jews
Moroccan emigrants to the Ottoman Empire
Orthodox rabbis
Burials at the Jewish cemetery on the Mount of Olives